Tengri Ermish Qaghan was the penultimate khagan of Turgesh.

Reign 
He was acknowledged as khagan by Xuanzong in October 753. He was a member of the Black Turgesh tribe.

References 

8th-century Turkic people
Türgesh khagans
8th-century rulers in Asia